Clarence Elmer Schmidt (September 17, 1925 – November 2, 1997) was an American professional ice hockey player who played seven games in the National Hockey League during the 1943-44 season. He played for the Boston Bruins. He had one goal and no assists with the Bruins. His lone goal came on February 5, 1944 in his team's 7-2 win over the New York Rangers at Boston Garden.

Career statistics

Regular season and playoffs

Notes

Bibliography

External links

1925 births
1997 deaths
American men's ice hockey right wingers
Boston Bruins players
Boston Olympics players
Ice hockey players from Minnesota
People from Lake of the Woods County, Minnesota
Warroad Lakers players